The  Green Bay Packers season was their 38th season overall and their 36th in the National Football League. The team finished with a 4–8 record under coach Lisle Blackbourn, earning them a fifth-place finish in the Western Conference.

Offseason

NFL draft 

 Green indicates a future Pro Football Hall of Fame inductee
 Yellow indicates a future Pro Bowl selection

Regular season

Schedule

Note: Intra-conference opponents are in bold text.

Standings

Roster

Awards and records 
 Tobin Rote, NFL Leader, Touchdown Passes, (18)

References 

 Sportsencyclopedia.com

Green Bay Packers seasons
Green Bay Packers